"Play with Me (Jane)" is a song from the British pop duo Thompson Twins, which was released in 1992 as a single from Songs from the Cool World, the soundtrack release for the 1992 film Cool World. The song was written and produced by Alannah Currie and Tom Bailey.

Background
"Play with Me (Jane)" was derived from "Strange Jane", a track which appeared on the Thompson Twins' 1991 studio album Queer. In 1992, a number of remixes were produced for the track under the new title. One remix was included in the American live-action/animated black comedy fantasy film Cool World and its accompanying soundtrack release in July 1992. The same month saw "Play with Me (Jane)" issued as a single in the UK, followed by a US release in October 1992.

Much like David Bowie's "Real Cool World", the preceding single from Cool World, "Play with Me (Jane)" did not meet commercial expectations and failed to generate mainstream success. However, the song was a hit on the UK club scene, with the "Full On Mix" reaching number 8 in the Record Mirror Club Chart in August 1992. In the US, the single reached number 5 on the Billboard Hot Dance Breakouts Maxi-Singles Sales chart in October 1992. It also saw chart action on the Street Information Network Top 50 Club Play chart. "Play with Me (Jane)" was the Thompson Twins' last single release. After dropping the name, Bailey and Currie moved to New Zealand and began recording music under the name Babble.

Critical reception
Upon its release as a single, Gina Morris of NME described "Play with Me (Jane)" as "yet another half-arsed Hippodrome floor filler" from the duo. Brett Anderson of Suede, as guest reviewer for the magazine, added, "Too much time in the studio. If a machine were to write a pop tune it would be this. Rubbish, sorry but it's flippant rubbish." Andrew Smith of Melody Maker remarked, "Last year, the Thompson Twins fooled the DJs when they scored a dance hit under a pseudonym. But they don't fool us. We've got a plan. We won't buy it."

Christian Jakubasczek of the German magazine Frontpage gave the single a three out of five star rating and described the song as "a very okay, driving, not necessarily innovative but acceptable house number". The reviewer felt the song was an "unforeseen comeback" for the Thompson Twins, although they considered "only the 'Play With Me' vocal" to serve as a reminder of the band's former pop work. The reviewer anticipated the song had hit potential on the German club scene. In the US, Larry Flick, writing for Billboard, described "Play with Me (Jane)" as a "techno-houser". He wrote, "Thanks to ethereal vocals by Alannah Currie and creative postproduction by Sinistra, the track smokes with potential at both rave and pop/house levels." Flick described the "Full On Mix" as "harsh and invigorating," and the "African NCP Mix" as having "a more cushiony bottom and hip tribal chants".

Formats

Personnel
Credits are adapted from the German and US CD single liner notes.

Production
 Tom Bailey, Alannah Currie – producers
 Keith Fernley – engineer
 Sinistra – remixer ("Full On Mix", "Sweet Garage Mix", "Full On Piano Edit")
 Tom & Jonna (for Sinistra) – remixers ("Dub Wash Mix")
 Feedback Max – additional production and remixes ("The Saint")

Other
 Mike Owen – photography 
 M@ Maitland – sleeve

Charts

References

1991 songs
1992 singles
Warner Records singles
Thompson Twins songs
Songs written by Alannah Currie
Songs written by Tom Bailey (musician)